Kankintú is a town in the Ngöbe Buglé province of Panama.

Sources 
World Gazeteer: Panama – World-Gazetteer.com

Populated places in Ngöbe-Buglé Comarca
Road-inaccessible communities of Panama